Olivia Trappeniers (born in Deurne, on 12 August 1997), better known by the acronym and stage name OT (to 2021) and by her mononym Olivia (since 2021), is a Belgian Flemish singer.

Trappeniers was born in Deurne, a suburb of Antwerp. She took part in The Voice van Vlaanderen the Belgian Flemish version of the television contest The Voice  in 2016, auditioning with Taylor Swift song "Blank Space" and choosing to be part of Bent Van Looy team. She only made to the first live show before being eliminated. Trappeniers gained some fame after winning the first edition of Belgian MNM radio station's Rising Star competition, with a cover of Martin Garrix's song "There for You". In 2017, she released the song "You Have a Heart" with Belgiasn/Dutch DJ and producer Regi. The single was certified gold record. That was followed with two more hits "Where Is My Love?" and "Bad Advice". In June 2019, DJ Regi released "Summer Life" featuring her as OT with Jaap Reesema credited by his stage name Jake Reese. The release was certified platinum. 

On November 1, 2019, Trappeniers released her debut EP Confessions with six solo songs. In 2020, she took part in the television program Liefde voor muziek (meaning For the love of music) on the TV channel VTM. Her song "Come a Little Closer" sung by her with Jake Reese won the Belgian Radio 2 Zomerhit (summerhit) award.

Discography

EPs
2019: Confessions EP

Singles
(Singles from 2017 to 2020 credited to OT. 2021 singles onward, credited to Olivia)

Songs featured in

References

External links
Facebook

Belgian women singers
1997 births
Living people
People from Deurne, Belgium